Slagsvold is a Norwegian surname. Notable people with the surname include:

Baard Slagsvold (born 1963), Norwegian musician
Lars Slagsvold (1887–1959), Norwegian veterinarian
Tore Slagsvold (born 1947), Norwegian zoologist

Norwegian-language surnames